Disney’s Kim Possible Movie: So the Drama (also known as Kim Possible Movie: So the Drama  or  Kim Possible: Day of the Diablos  in the working title) is a 2005 Disney Channel Original Movie produced by Walt Disney Television Animation. It is the second TV film based on the animated television series Kim Possible. This film includes a mix of hand-drawn animation and computer animation.

The film premiered April 8, 2005 on Disney Channel and on April 11, 2005 on Toon Disney. It was the first animated Disney Channel Original Movie. This film was aired before the last few episodes of the series' third season but is considered the three-part season three finale.

The film was originally intended to be the series finale but Disney Channel ultimately renewed the series, and the 23-episode fourth season of Kim Possible premiered on February 10, 2007, with events of the series continuing after the movie itself. The film also features Christy Carlson Romano's single "Could It Be." The film features a plot similar to the first aired episode of the series, "Crush."

Plot
Dr. Drakken has been developing a new and elaborate master plan to take over the world. Among the plan's stages are the procurement of a new toy design stolen from Japanese developer Nakasumi, the creation of synthodrone androids, and a bizarre research project investigating the lifestyle of teenage girls.

Meanwhile, Kim Possible realizes that her crime-fighting career has left her with only Ron Stoppable as a potential date for the junior prom, much to her distress. Ron introduces Kim to Eric, a new student, and they soon become a couple, causing a jealous Ron to find himself edged out of Kim's life. Ron also begins to notice numerous annoying changes at Bueno Nacho, his favorite fast-food chain.

Drakken kidnaps Kim's father, who possesses the most advanced cybertronic technology in existence, which can fix, modify, or enlarge any machine. Kim and Ron rescue Dr. Possible, unaware that Drakken has already obtained his knowledge in cybertronics by tapping his brain. Bueno Nacho introduces their first kiddie meals, which come with toy robot figures called "Lil' Diablos" (based on Nakasumi's design) that become vastly popular worldwide. Kim realizes Ron's growing unhappiness and talks with him, promising that her new relationship with Eric will not affect their friendship. While Kim and Eric attend prom together, Ron, depressed and conflicted by his changing feelings for Kim, becomes upset again by Bueno Nacho and makes a call complaining to the new owner, who is revealed to be Drakken. Lars, Bueno Nacho's new manager and one of Drakken's goons, activates the Diablo army of toys which pursue Ron and his pet mole-rat Rufus.

Escaping the Diablos, Ron bursts into the prom to warn Kim about the toys. Kim contacts her assistant Wade, who confirms that the Diablos are made from Dr. Possible's technology. In retaliation, Drakken attacks Middleton, transforming the toys into large, deadly robots with a command signal at Bueno Nacho. With help from the Possible family, Kim and Ron destroy the command signal, disabling the Diablos. Drakken shows Kim that his sidekick Shego has kidnapped Eric after she left the prom dance, and demands her surrender in exchange for Eric's safety.

Kim dons a new experimental battle suit and heads with Ron and Rufus to Bueno Nacho headquarters, where Drakken and his forces are operating from. Kim fights and defeats Shego before reuniting with Eric, who is revealed to be a synthodrone made by Drakken to distract her from his plans; he shocks Kim unconscious and she is captured along with Ron. At midnight, Drakken launches a worldwide attack with the giant Diablo robots. Embarrassed and distressed by Eric's betrayal, Kim admits defeat and gives up, but Ron encourages her by finally confessing his feelings for her, which she accepts.

Rufus helps Kim and Ron escape and they head to Bueno Nacho's roof to destroy the tower controlling the Diablos with an EMP. Shego and Eric intervene, but Kim fires the EMP at the tower. Eric catches it just in time, but Rufus destroys him by puncturing his foot, draining all his cyber liquid and making him drop the EMP on the tower, shutting down all the robots and returning them to their normal sizes. Drakken and his henchmen are arrested and Kim and Ron are hailed as heroes for saving the world once again. They return to prom holding hands, where students (except for Bonnie Rockwaller) cheer them as they dance and share their first real kiss.

Cast
 Christy Carlson Romano as Kimberly Ann "Kim" Possible
 Will Friedle as Ronald "Ron" Stoppable
 Nancy Cartwright as Rufus
 Tahj Mowry as Wade Load
 John DiMaggio as Dr. Drakken (Drew Theodore P. Lipsky)
 Nicole Sullivan as Shego
 Ricky Ullman as Eric
 Gary Cole as Dr. James Timothy Possible
 Jean Smart as Dr. Ann Possible
 Shaun Fleming as Jim and Tim Possible
 Raven-Symoné as Monique
 Kirsten Storms as Bonnie Rockwaller
 Rider Strong as Brick Flagg
 Diedrich Bader as Lars
 Eddie Deezen as Ned
 Clyde Kusatsu as Nakasumi
 Lauren Tom as Miss Kyoko
Kevin Michael Richardson as Sumo Ninja / Dr. Gooberman
 Maurice LaMarche as Big Daddy Brotherson
 Tara Strong as Dr. Possible's voice command
 April Winchell as Reporter

Reception
David Nusair from Reel Film Reviews rated the film 2.5/4 stating that the plot was thin and the kids would enjoy it more than adults but it is genuinely funny with better than expected voice acting.

Kevin Carr from 7M Pictures rated the film 3.5/5 and declared the movie may not be fine art but would be enjoyable for the right audience.

Reviewer Mike Long from Jackass Critics, reacting to the film as a possible final installment of the Kim Possible series, commented that it "is a fitting denouement, as it encompasses everything that made the show a stand-out on The Disney Channel."

Home media
An extended version of the film was released on May 10, 2005. It featured Christy Carlson Romano’s music video “Could It Be” and a never-before-seen episode of Kim Possible “Gorilla Fist”

As of November 12, 2019 it is available to stream on Disney+.

References

External links

 
 
 
 

2005 television films
2005 animated films
2005 films
2000s American animated films
Animated films based on animated series
Disney Channel Original Movie films
Kim Possible films
Android (robot) films
American animated television films
Rough Draft Studios films
Animated films set in Tokyo
Films set in Colorado
Disney Television Animation films
Disney direct-to-video animated films
2000s English-language films
Films directed by Steve Loter